Sarah Behbehani (born 3 November 1989) is a Kuwaiti tennis player.

Behbehani made her WTA main draw debut at the 2021 Dubai Tennis Championships, where she received a wildcard to the doubles main draw.

References

External links
 
 

1989 births
Living people
Kuwaiti tennis players
Tennis players from San Francisco